Lambis millepeda, common name the millipede spider conch,  is a species of sea snail, a marine gastropod mollusk in the family Strombidae, the true conchs.

Description
Classic lambis design. The legs are round and short in structure. The color extends from white, sand-colored with light brown shades. The underside has black furrows in the mouth. The size of an adult shell varies between 90-201 mm.

Distribution
This species occurs in the Indian Ocean off Madagascar and in the Southwest Pacific Ocean.

References

 Walls, J.G. (1980). Conchs, tibias and harps. A survey of the molluscan families Strombidae and Harpidae. T.F.H. Publications Ltd, Hong Kong

External links
 

Strombidae
Gastropods described in 1758
Taxa named by Carl Linnaeus